Cathedral of San Juan or San Juan Cathedral, and variants thereof, may refer to:

North and Central America
 Catedral Metropolitana Basílica de San Juan Bautista (San Juan, Puerto Rico)
 Episcopal Cathedral of St. John the Baptist (San Juan, Puerto Rico)
 San Juan de los Lagos Cathedral Basilica, Mexico
 San Juan Bautista Metropolitan Cathedral (Tulancingo), Mexico
 San Juan Bautista Cathedral (Ciudad Altamirano), Mexico
 San Juan Bautista Cathedral (Jinotega), Nicaragua
 San Juan Bautista Cathedral (Penonomé), Panama
 San Juan Bautista Cathedral (Trujillo), Honduras

South America
 Anglican Cathedral of St. John the Baptist, Buenos Aires, Argentina
 San Juan Bautista Cathedral Basilica (Lima), Peru
 San Juan Bautista Cathedral Basilica (Salto), Uruguay
 San Juan Bautista Metropolitan Cathedral (San Juan de Cuyo), Argentina
 San Juan Bautista Cathedral (Calama), Chile
 San Juan Bautista Cathedral (Carora), Venezuela
 San Juan Bautista Cathedral (Chachapoyas), Peru
 San Juan Bautista Cathedral (Engativá), Colombia
 San Juan Bautista Cathedral (Iquitos), Peru
 San Juan Bosco Cathedral (Comodoro Rivadavia), Argentina
 San Juan Pablo II Cathedral (Ciudad Guayana), Venezuela

Asia
 San Juan Evangelista Metropolitan Cathedral (Dagupan), Philippines
 San Juan Evangelista Metropolitan Cathedral (Naga), Philippines
 San Juan Bautista Cathedral (Kalibo), Philippines
 Old San Juan Evangelista Cathedral (Dagupan), Philippines

Europe
 San Juan Bautista Metropolitan Cathedral (Badajoz), Spain
 San Juan Bautista Cathedral (Albacete), Spain

See also
St. John the Baptist Cathedral (disambiguation)
St. John's Cathedral (disambiguation)